Backblast may refer to:

Fictional characters
 Backblast (G.I. Joe), a fictional character in the G.I. Joe universe
 Backblast, member of the Deep Space Team of Mini-Cons in the Transformers universe

Other uses
 Backblast area, the area behind a rocket launcher which needs to be clear of personnel